Maelisa Mac Gillco Erain was an Irish priest in the late Twelfth century: the first recorded Archdeacon of Kilmore.

References

Archdeacons of Kilmore